Oregon Coast Technology School, also known as ORCO TECH, is a public charter school in North Bend, Oregon, United States. It serves students in grades 6-12; middle school students (grades 6-8) attend classes at North Bend Middle School, while students in grades 9-12 attend classes at North Bend High School.

Academics
In 2008, 100% of the school's seniors received their high school diploma. Of 13 students, 13 graduated and none dropped out.

References

High schools in Coos County, Oregon
Charter schools in Oregon
Education in Coos County, Oregon
Public high schools in Oregon
Public middle schools in Oregon
North Bend, Oregon